Physarum is a genus of mycetozoan slime molds in the family Physaraceae.

It contains the following species:

Physarum albescens
Physarum album
Physarum andinum
Physarum bivalve
Physarum bogoriense
Physarum cinereum
Physarum citrinum
Physarum compressum
Physarum confertum
Physarum conglomeratum
Physarum crateriforme
Physarum daamsii
Physarum didermoides
Physarum digitatum
Physarum flavicomum
Physarum florigerum
Physarum globuliferum
Physarum gyrosum
Physarum hongkongense
Physarum lakhanpalii
Physarum lateritium
Physarum leucophaeum
Physarum loratum
Physarum luteolum
Physarum melleum
Physarum mortonii
Physarum mutabile
Physarum nigripodum
Physarum nucleatum
Physarum nutans
Physarum oblatum
Physarum plicatum
Physarum polycephalum
Physarum psittacinum
Physarum pulcherrimum
Physarum pusillum
Physarum reniforme
Physarum rigidum
Physarum roseum
Physarum stellatum
Physarum sulphureum
Physarum superbum
Physarum tenerum
Physarum virescens
Physarum viride

References

External links

Amoebozoa genera
Physaraceae